The BYD Yuan (比亚迪元) is a subcompact crossover SUV produced by Chinese electric vehicle manufacturer BYD Auto, slotting below the BYD Song compact crossover. It is part of BYD's "Dynasty Series" of production vehicles, and is named after the Yuan dynasty.

Released since March 2016, the BYD Yuan is currently available only as an all-electric vehicle, although previously a gasoline and a plug-in hybrid version were also offered. The gasoline version of BYD Yuan was sold since 2015 as the BYD S1 before being renamed and becoming part of the Yuan family. In some markets the S1 name was kept, and reused even for the all-electric version. The BYD S2 is an all-electric subcompact crossover that is essentially a rebadged Yuan, shorter than the original Yuan and the S1, and was launched in 2019.

The second-generation model was revealed in July 2021. It is marketed as the BYD Yuan Plus (or BYD Atto 3 in many markets). Compared to the first generation, it features slightly larger dimensions, a more upmarket design, and BYD's proprietary blade battery.

First generation (2015)

The BYD Yuan is the fourth BYD product and the third BYD crossover using the Chinese dynasty naming system, following the BYD Song compact crossover, the BYD Tang mid-size crossover and the BYD Qin compact sedan. Just like they did with the BYD Song, BYD has decided to use the same name (Yuan) for the entire powertrain range, including a gasoline version, a hybrid version and an electric version (previously the gasoline version was known as the S1, while the hybrid and electric versions used the Yuan nameplate from the beginning).

BYD S1

The BYD S1 is a gasoline-powered subcompact crossover launched by BYD in 2015. Besides the Chinese market, it was also offered in the Philippines. In the Chinese market, with the introduction of the Yuan nameplate in 2016, the S1 was renamed and was since sold as the gasoline version of the Yuan.

In some non-Chinese markets, the old S1 name was kept, despite the renaming of the vehicle in China. Even the all-electric variant of the Yuan was known in some markets as the S1 EV.

BYD Yuan facelift and Yuan EV

In 2018, the BYD Yuan was facelifted, with the new "Dragon Face" styling of the front end, in line with all the other "dynasty" series products. The all-electric Yuan EV360 was also launched with prices ranging from 79,900 yuan to 99,900 yuan. There is also the BYD Yuan EV535 with a larger, 53.2 kWh battery.

2020 Yuan EV
As of August 2020, the only variants of the Yuan advertised by BYD in China are all-electric. Alongside the 2019 BYD Yuan EV360 (42 kWh battery), the 2020 BYD Yuan EV is offered, with two battery options: 40.62 kWh and 53.22 kWh.

Yuan Pro (2021 facelift)
The Yuan EV received a facelift for the 2021 model year called the Yuan Pro. The Yuan Pro features a redesigned front fascia in the same style as the BYD Han EV.

The interior is largely carried over from the pre-facelift model with the 10.1-inch multimedia screen, and is integrated with the DiLink3.0 intelligent connected system featuring voice command, voice notifications, Bluetooth phone calls, phone connectivity and mobile onboard television.

BYD S2

The BYD S2 is an all-electric subcompact crossover, shorter than the Yuan and the S1 (4100 mm vs 4360 mm) and sold in China since 2019. The battery capacity is 40.62 kWh.

Second generation (2021)

News of a second-generation all-electric model of the Yuan surfaced in July 2021, with the model being branded Yuan Plus to differentiate it from the first generation Yuan that continued to be sold. The model is branded Atto 3 in international markets. The Yuan Plus is significantly larger than the Yuan and Yuan Pro, and is now closer in size to a compact crossover.

Unlike other models in the Dynasty Series, the Yuan Plus is based on BYD's latest e-Platform 3.0 design and is equipped with a  front wheel drive electric motor providing  of torque, powered by BYD's proprietary lithium iron phosphate (LFP) "blade battery".

The Yuan Plus' interior design is inspired by fitness culture and features aesthetics resembling gym and sports equipment such as treadmill, boxing ring, dumbbells and muscle fibers. The centre 12.8" infotainment screen can be rotated between portrait and landscape orientations.

Safety 
BYD Atto 3 rated 5 star in Euro NCAP.

Notes

References

External links 

 Electric Cars, Sedans and SUVs I BYD Europe

2010s cars
Yuan
Cars introduced in 2016
Front-wheel-drive vehicles
Mini sport utility vehicles
Crossover sport utility vehicles
Production electric cars